The Republic of Negros was a short-lived revolutionary entity which had existed on the island of Negros first as a canton of the First Philippine Republic and later as a protectorate of the United States.

Nomenclature
The entity had gone by multiple names throughout its short existence: the Negros Canton of the First Philippine Republic, and the Federal Republic of Negros or Federal State of Negros under US protection. According to Gregorio Zaide, the protectorate had been annexed to the Philippine Islands as simply the Republic of Negros.

History 

From November 3 to 6, 1898, the Negrenses rose in revolt against the Imperial Spanish authorities headed by the politico-military governor, colonel Isidro de Castro. The Spaniards decided to surrender upon seeing armed troops marching in a pincer movement towards Bacólod, the main city of the island. The revolutionaries, led by generals Juan Araneta, from Bago and Aniceto Lacson, from Talisay, were actually carrying fake arms consisting of rifles carved out of palm fronds and cannons of rolled bamboo mats painted black. On 5 November, Spanish officials surrendered themselves to native leaders. A provisional government was then established with Aniceto Lacson as President, and a notice of this was sent by Melecio Severino to Emilio Aguinaldo on Luzón. On November 27, 1898, the unicameral Congress of Deputies met in Bacólod and declared the establishment of the Republican Canton of Negros. The Congress of Deputies acted as a constituent assembly to draft a constitution.

Motivated by either economic interests or sheer realpolitik, the hacendero-led cantonal government surrendered to U.S. forces on March 4, 1899, following the outbreak of hostilities between the nascent First Philippine Republic and the U.S. military government which had been established during the Spanish–American War, and came under U.S. protection on April 30, 1899 as a territory separate from the Philippine Islands. A constitution for a Federal Republic of Negros, which proposed two governors, a U.S. military governor and a civil governor elected by the voters of Negros, was framed by a committee sitting in Bacólod and sent to General Otis in Manila and was proclaimed to take effect on October 2, 1899. The Negros government operated smoothly under this constitution until the province of Occidental Negros was established on April 20, 1901, and annexed to the Philippine Islands by the United States as the "Republic of Negros".

Leaders
The leaders of the short-lived republic were:

{|class=wikitable
|-
|Aniceto Lacson(November 5, 1898 - November 27, 1898)November 5, 1898 - July 22, 1899 || (President in Negros Occidental only until November 27, 1898)President
|-
|Demetrio Larena(November 24, 1898 - November 27, 1898)November 5, 1898 - July 22, 1899 || (President in Negros Oriental only)Vice-President
|-
|José de LuzuriagaJuly 22, 1899 - November 6, 1899|| President of the Chamber of Deputies
|-
| Eusebio Luzurriaga || Secretary of the Treasury
|-
| Simeón Lizares || Secretary of the Interior 
|-
| Nicolás Gólez || Secretary of Public Works
|-
| Agustín Amenábar || Secretary of Agriculture and Commerce
|-
|Juan Araneta || Secretary of War
|-
|Antonio Ledesma JaymeJuly 24, 1854 - October 9, 1937|| Secretary of Justice
|-
|Melecio SeverinoNovember 6, 1899 - April 30, 1901|| Governor-General of the Provinces
|-
|}

Commemoration 

November 5, popularly referred to by the Negrenses as Cinco de Noviembre, has been officially observed since 1989 as a special non-working holiday in Negros Occidental. The republic itself has been commemorated in a historical marker in the main square of Bago, on which is inscribed:

References 

(Note: 1. The book cover incorrectly lists author as "Maximo M Lalaw", 2. Originally published in 1921 by The McCullough Printing Co., Manila)

Republic of Negros
Republic of Negros
Republic of Negros
Politics of Siquijor
Former subdivisions of the Philippines
Former subdivisions of the United States
States and territories established in 1898
States and territories disestablished in 1901
Republic of Negros
Republic of Negros
Republic of Negros
Republic of Negros